The  Brennabor Typ Z, launched in 1928,  was a car introduced by the Brennabor company, replacing the Brennabor Typ R, as the company’s contender in the medium-sized car sector, had been a best seller on the German market during the modest return to economic growth that characterized the middle years of the decade after the reparations issue had, to an extent, been resolved.   The Typ Z was itself replaced after just a year by Brennabor Ideal Typ N which would represent a more comprehensive upgrade

The Typ Z retained the same engine capacity and claimed  power output of its predecessor, but was slightly shorter and lower (though wider and no lighter).   The rear axle was now provided with underslung half leaf springs, a system which would later be adopted by the competing auto-maker Horch for luxury models such as the Horch 850.

The Brennabor Typ Z was offered with a range of body types, with two or four doors and as a sedan or open-topped sedan.   A two-door full cabriolet was also available.   Approximately 10,000 were produced.

Technical details

Sources 
 Werner Oswald: Deutsche Autos 1920–1945. Motorbuch Verlag Stuttgart, 10. Auflage (1996), 

Brennabor vehicles
Motorcycles introduced in the 1920s

de:Brennabor Typ Z